Solanum leiophyllum is a species of plant in the family Solanaceae. It is endemic to Ecuador.

References

leiophyllum
Endemic flora of Ecuador
Vulnerable plants
Taxonomy articles created by Polbot